Thomas Martin Kerrigan (July 7, 1906 – July 29, 1979) was an American professional football player who spent two seasons in the National Football League with the Orange Tornadoes in 1929 and the Newark Tornadoes in 1930, appearing in 5 career games, making two starts.

References

1906 births
1979 deaths
Orange Tornadoes players
Newark Tornadoes players
Players of American football from New York City